was a Japanese football player. He played for Japan national team. He is sometimes known as Shojiro Nomura (野村 正二郎).

Club career
Sugimura was born in Osaka on April 4, 1905. He played for Waseda WMW was consisted of his alma mater Waseda University players and graduates. At the club, he played with many Japan national team players Shigeyoshi Suzuki, Haruo Arima, Misao Tamai, Tamotsu Asakura, Shigeru Takahashi, Nagayasu Honda, Ko Takamoro and Michiyo Taki.

National team career
In August 1927, when Sugimura was a Waseda University student, he was selected Japan national team for 1927 Far Eastern Championship Games in Shanghai. At this competition, on August 27, he debuted against Republic of China.

After retirement
After retirement, Sugimura joined Japan Football Association and served as a director. He also worked Ministry of Education, Science and Culture and taught as professor at Sophia University.

On January 15, 1975, Sugimura died of myocardial infarction in Bunkyo, Tokyo at the age of 69.

National team statistics

References

External links
 
 Japan National Football Team Database

1905 births
1975 deaths
Waseda University alumni
Association football people from Osaka Prefecture
Sportspeople from Osaka
Japanese footballers
Japan international footballers
Association football midfielders